Provincial heritage sites in South Africa are places that are of historic or cultural importance within the context of the province concerned and which are for this reason declared in terms of Section 28 of the National Heritage Resources Act (NHRA) or legislation of the applicable province. The designation was a new one that came into effect with the introduction of the Act on 1 April 2000 when all former national monuments declared by the former National Monuments Council and its predecessors became provincial heritage sites as provided for in Section 58 of the Act.

Both provincial and national heritage sites are protected under the terms of Section 27 of the NHRA or legislation of the relevant province and a permit is required to work on them.  Provincial heritage sites are declared and administered by the relevant provincial heritage resources authority whilst national heritage sites are the responsibility of SAHRA.

KwaZulu-Natal is the only province to have its own heritage legislation and provincial heritage sites are known as either 'heritage landmarks' or 'provincial landmarks' depending upon whether they are privately or government owned.

Most provincial heritage sites are still marked with an old national monuments badge, but provincial heritage resources authorities in KwaZulu-Natal, the Northern Cape and Western Cape have developed their own badges.

List of Heritage sites by province

The lists have been split up by province. Some districts have been split off from their province for site performance reasons. 
 List of heritage sites in Eastern Cape

 List of heritage sites in Albany
 List of heritage sites in Graaff-Reinet
 List of heritage sites in Port Elizabeth

 List of heritage sites in Free State
 List of heritage sites in Gauteng
 List of heritage sites in KwaZulu-Natal

 List of heritage sites in Pietermaritzburg

 List of heritage sites in Limpopo
 List of heritage sites in Mpumalanga
 List of heritage sites in North West
 List of heritage sites in Northern Cape

 List of heritage sites in Colesberg
 List of heritage sites in Kimberley
 List of heritage sites in Richmond
 List of heritage sites in Victoria West

 List of heritage sites in Western Cape

 List of heritage sites in Paarl
 List of heritage sites in Simonstown
 List of heritage sites in Stellenbosch
 List of heritage sites in Swellendam
 List of heritage sites in Table Mountain
 List of heritage sites in the Cape
 List of heritage sites in Tulbagh
 List of heritage sites in Worcester
 List of heritage sites in Wynberg

See also
 List of heritage sites in South Africa
 Heritage objects (South Africa)
 South African Heritage Resources Agency
 Amafa aKwaZulu-Natali
 Heritage Western Cape
 National Monuments Council (South Africa and Namibia)

References

External links
 South African Heritage Resource Agency

Provincial Heritage Resources Authorities: 
 KwaZulu Natal - Amafa/Heritage KwaZulu Natal
 Western Cape - Heritage Western Cape 
 Free State - Heritage Free State
 Eastern Cape - Eastern Cape Provincial Heritage Resources Authority
 Mpumalanga - Mpumalanga Provincial Heritage Resources Authority
 Limpopo - Limpopo Heritage Resources Authority 
 North West - North West Provincial Heritage Resources Authority 
 Northern Cape - Ngwao-Boswa Jwa Kapa Bokone  
 Gauteng - Provincial Heritage Resources Authority Gauteng
 Searchable database of protected sites, objects and shipwrecks

Heritage registers in South Africa
Historic sites in South Africa
South African heritage resources
South African heritage sites